Exit Point is a 2019 Filipino action film starring Ronnie Ricketts, who also serves as the film co-writer and director under the name Ronn Rick. It also stars Jackielou Blanco, Alvin Anson, Raechelle Ricketts, Edgar Mande, Renzo Cruz, Jerico Estregan, and Joachim Idinye. The film was released by Viva Films on February 20, 2019.

The film marks Ricketts' cinematic comeback after 2013's The Fighting Chefs, though a month after Exit Points release, Ricketts was sentenced to prison for six to eight years after he was found guilty of graft by the Sandiganbayan during his tenure as chairman of the Optical Media Board and his involvement in the seizing of pirated DVDs and VCDs during the 2010 raid of the Sky High Marketing Corporation offices in Quiapo, Manila.

Cast
Ronnie Ricketts as Capt. Wilfredo "Waldo" Ocampo
Jackie Lou Blanco as Director Sarah M. Fernandez 
Alvin Anson as Guido 
Raechelle Ricketts as Aliona 
Edgar Mande as Beki Bato 
Renzo Cruz as Captain Robles 
Jerico Estregan as Julio 
Joachim Idinye as Fred 
Sung Joon Park as Sung Joon Kim 
Natalia Moon as Mikee 
Mandy Ochoa as General Fernandez 
Brandon Ricketts as Bagets 
Neil Perez as Lt. Santos 
Luigi Fernando as Capt. Mendoza 
Rey Bejar as Bobby 
Bill Toledo as Ricky 
Jayson Garcia as Lucas 
Ramon Alatiit as Batang Taong Gubat 
Marella Ricketts as Attorney 
Romalyn Gascon as Waldo's Daughter
Irene Fujisawa as Aliona's Mother
Mariz Ricketts as Waldo's Wife
Annie Mata as Chinese Wife 
Mikhayla as Aliona's Sister

References

External links

2019 films
Filipino-language films
Philippine action films
Viva Films films